My Mother's Secret is a 2015 Philippine television drama series broadcast by GMA Network. Directed by Neal del Rosario, it stars Kim Rodriguez and Gwen Zamora. It premiered on May 25, 2015 on the network's Telebabad line up replacing the rerun of My Love from the Star. The series concluded on August 7, 2015 with a total of 54 episodes. It was replaced by Reply 1997 in its timeslot.

The series is streaming online on YouTube.

Premise
Neri's dream is a good life with her mother, Cora. But due to unexpected circumstances, she began to know the couple, Vivian and Anton - who will adopt her and send her to school. It will start to change her life including to know the truth that Vivian is her real mother.

Cast and characters

Lead cast
 Kim Rodriguez as Nerissa "Neri" Pastor-Guevarra

Supporting cast
 Gwen Zamora as Vivian Pastor-Guevarra
Christian Bautista as Anton Guevarra
 Lotlot De Leon as Cora Macapugay
 Kiko Estrada as Craig de Leon
 Shamaine Centenera-Buencamino as Esther Guevarra
 Meryll Soriano as Stella Pastor
 Enzo Pineda as Gavin de Leon
 Diva Montelaba as Lorraine de Leon
 Jhoana Marie Tan as Karen Pastor Lopez
 Frances Makil-Ignacio as Chato de Villa
 Ervic Vijandre as Edwin Lopez 
 Tricia Cabais as Heidi P. Guevarra / Heidi P. Lopez

Guest cast
 Mark Herras as Migs San Real
 Sam Pinto as Lucy Arevalo
 Caprice Cayetano as young Nerisa "Neri" Guevarra
 Richard Quan as Bernard
 Mike Lloren as Luis
 Coleen Perez as Paula
 Miggs Cuaderno as Mac

Episodes

May 2015

June 2015

July 2015

August 2015

Episodes notes

Ratings
According to AGB Nielsen Philippines' Mega Manila household television ratings, the pilot episode of My Mother's Secret earned a 9.7% rating. While the final episode scored an 11.5% rating. The series had its highest rating on July 24, 2015 with a 14.4%
rating.

References

External links
 

2015 Philippine television series debuts
2015 Philippine television series endings
Filipino-language television shows
GMA Network drama series
Television shows set in the Philippines